Eden Township is a township in Sac County, Iowa, USA.

The township's elevation is listed as 1325 feet above mean sea level.

References

Townships in Sac County, Iowa
Townships in Iowa